Shah Bolagh may refer to:
 Shah Bolagh, East Azerbaijan
 Shah Bolagh, Hamadan
 Shah Bolagh, Barf Anbar, Fereydunshahr County, Isfahan Province
 Shah Bolagh, Pishkuh-e Mugui, Fereydunshahr County, Isfahan Province
 Shah Bolagh, Semnan

See also
 Shah Bodagh